Leptaena is an extinct genus of mid-sized brachiopod that existed from the Dariwilian epoch to the Emsian epoch, though some specimens have been found in strata as late in age as the Tournasian epoch. Like some other Strophomenids, Lepteana were epifaunal, meaning they lived on top of the seafloor, not buried within it, and were suspension feeders.

Physical description
Leptaena usually have concentric wrinkling and concentric lines on the shell. Leptaena have a concavo-convex profile, and are sometimes Semiquadrate to semielliptical. The Cardinal Process is split in two and the hinge line is straight. Their width is usually greater than their length, like most Strophomenids.

Distribution
Leptaena fossils have been found on every continent except Antarctica.

Species
Leptaena was a diverse genus, with over 70 recognized species and subgenera. Species in the genus Leptaena include the following. Any synonymous genera to which a given species may belong to are labelled with the synonymous genus in parentheses.

L. acuta (Kurnamena) (Roomusoks, 2004)
L. acuticuspidata Amsden, 1958
L. aequalis Amsden, 1974
L. alliku (Oraspold, 1956)
L. altera Rybnikova, 1966
L. amelia (Havlicek, 1967)
L. analogaeformis Biernat, 1966
L. arberae Kelly, 1967
L. argentina (Thomas, 1905)
L. bergstroemi Cocks, 2005
L. borghiana Mergl & Massa, 1992
L. boyaca Caster, 1939
L. contermina Cocks, 1968
L. convexa Weller, 1914
L. cooperi Easton et al., 1958
L. crassorugata (Similoleptaena) (Rõõmusoks, 2004)
L. croma (Havlicek & Storch, 1990)
L.crypta Opik, 1930
L. cryptoides (Oraspold, 1956)
L. dejecta (Baarli, 1995)
L. delicata Amsden, 1949 
L. depressa (Sowerby, 1825)
L. diademata (Williams, 1962)
L. electra (Havlicek, 1967)
L. ennessbe Spjeldnaes, 1957
L. enucleata Klenina, 1984
L. friedrichi (Similoleptaena) (Rõõmusoks, 2004)
L. gibbosa (James, 1874)
L. haverfordensis Bancroft, 1949
L. holcrofti Bassett, 1974
L. indigena Spjeldnaes, 1957
L. infrunita (Williams, 1962)
L. ingrica (Similoleptaena) (Rõõmusoks, 2004)
L. juvenilis (Öpik, 1930)
L. kentuckiana Pope, 1982
L. lappa (Havlicek & Storch, 1990)
L. lappina (Havlicek & Storch, 1990)
L. laterorugata (Kurnamena) (Roomusoks, 1989)
L. lemniscata (Havlicek, 1967)
L. limbifera (Havlicek, 1967)
L. martinensis Cocks, 1968
L. moniquensis Foerste, 1924
L. nanaformis Zhang et al., 1983
L. nassichuki Smith, 1980 
L. odeon Havlicek, 1967
L. oklahomensis Amsden, 1951
L. ordovicica (Cooper, 1956)
L. orhor (Havlicek & Storch, 1990)
L. palmrei (Kurnamena) (Roomusoks, 2004)
L. parvirugata Hoel, 2005
L. parvissima Ivanovskii & Kulkov, 1974
L. paucirugata (Roomusoks 1989)
L. pertenuis (Similoleptaena) (Rõõmusoks, 2004)
L. planitia (Similoleptaena) (Rõõmusoks, 2004)
L. poulseni Kelly, 1967
L. praequalis Rozman, 1977
L. provellerosa (Havlicek & Storch, 1990)
L. purpurea Cocks, 1968
L. quadrata Bancroft, 1949
L. quadrilatera (Logan, 1863)
L. rara (Alekseeva and Erlanger, 1983) 
L. reedi Cocks, 1968
L. rhomboidalis (Wahlanberg, 1818)
L. richmondensis Foerste, 1909
L. roomusoki Cocks, 2005
L. rugata (Lindström, 1861)
L. rugaurita (Havlicek, 1967)
L. rugosa (Dalman, 1828)
L. rugosides Oraspold, 1956
L. salopiensis (Williams, 1963)
L. semiradiata Sowerby, 1842
L. senecta Roomusoks, 2004
L. sperion Bassett, 1977
L. spumiferra (Kurnamea) (Opik, 1930)
L. strandi (Spjeldnaes, 1957)
L. tarwanpensis (Similoleptaena) (Rõõmusoks, 2004)
L. taxilla (Kurnamena) (Oraspold, 1965)
L. tenuissimestriata McCoy, 1852
L. tenuistrata Sowerby, 1839
L. tenuistriata (de Sowerby and Murchison, 1839)
L. trifidium (Leptaenopoma) (Marek and Havlíček, 1967)
L. trifidum (Marek and Havlíček, 1967)
L. undosa (Similoleptaena) (Rõõmusoks, 2004)
L. valentia (Cocks, 1968)
L. valida Bancroft, 1949
L. veldrensis Spjeldnaes, 1957
L. vellerosa Havlicek, 1967
L. ventricosa Williams, 1963 
L. zeta Lamont, 1947
L. ziegleri Cocks, 1968

References

Prehistoric brachiopods
Strophomenida
Prehistoric brachiopod genera
Ordovician brachiopods
Silurian brachiopods
Devonian brachiopods
Paleozoic animals of Africa
Paleozoic animals of Asia
Paleozoic animals of Australia
Paleozoic animals of Europe
Paleozoic animals of North America
Paleozoic animals of Oceania
Paleozoic animals of South America
Paleozoic brachiopods of Africa
Paleozoic brachiopods of Asia
Paleozoic brachiopods of Europe
Paleozoic brachiopods of North America
Paleozoic brachiopods of Oceania
Paleozoic brachiopods of South America
Fossils of Afghanistan
Fossils of Argentina
Fossils of Australia
Fossils of Belarus
Fossils of Bolivia
Fossils of Canada
Paleozoic life of Manitoba
Paleozoic life of New Brunswick
Paleozoic life of Newfoundland and Labrador
Paleozoic life of Nova Scotia
Paleozoic life of the Northwest Territories
Paleozoic life of Nunavut
Paleozoic life of Ontario
Paleozoic life of Quebec
Paleozoic life of Yukon
Fossils of China
Fossils of Colombia
Fossils of the Czech Republic
Fossils of Estonia
Fossils of France
Fossils of Germany
Fossils of Greenland
Fossils of Iran
Fossils of Ireland
Fossils of Italy
Fossils of Kazakhstan
Fossils of Latvia
Fossils of Lithuania
Fossils of Libya
Fossils of Mexico
Fossils of Mongolia
Fossils of Morocco
Fossils of Myanmar
Fossils of New Zealand
Fossils of Norway
Fossils of Poland
Fossils of Portugal
Fossils of Russia
Fossils of Spain
Fossils of Sweden
Fossils of Turkey
Fossils of Ukraine
Fossils of Great Britain
Fossils of the United States
Fossils of Georgia (U.S. state)
Fossils of Venezuela
Fossil taxa described in 1828